Valka is a town and municipality in northern Latvia, on the border with Estonia along both banks of the river Pedele.

Valka and the Estonian town Valga are twins, separated by the Estonian/Latvian border but using the slogan "One Town, Two Countries". The border dividing the Livonian town of Walk was marked out in 1920 by an international jury headed by British Colonel Stephen George Tallents. With the expansion of the Schengen Agreement and abolition of the Estonian/Latvian border in 2007, it was announced that common public bus transport would be established between Valka and Valga. Also, all border crossing-points were removed and roads and fences opened. In 2016 it was announced that due to better welfare and higher salaries in Estonia, many Valka inhabitants have registered themselves as inhabitants of Valga.

History
The town of Walk (in German) was first mentioned in 1286 and from 1419 was the seat of the Landtag of the Livonian Confederation. City rights were granted by the Polish-Lithuanian king Stefan Batory in 1584. However, the town gained its importance only at the end of the 19th century when the Vidzeme teacher's seminary was operating here, and the important railway junction was developed. Furthermore, the first narrow-gauge railway line in the territory of modern Latvia was stretched from Valka to Estonian city of Pärnu.

On 15 November 1917 the decision of the Latvian Provisional National Council to proclaim the independent Republic of Latvia was made in Valka. The red-white-red flag of Latvia was raised here for the first time. The town was a subject of a dispute between the newly born Latvian and Estonian states; on 1 July 1920 the town was divided between the two states as a compromise.

Education
There is one primary school and a gymnasium in Valka.
The Institute of Latvia-Estonia provides further education.

Notable people
Jānis Cimze (1814–1881), pedagogue, founder of Vidzeme teacher's seminary - first higher education institution in Latvia's territory
Aigars Fadejevs (born 1975), Olympic race-walker, winner of silver medal at Olympic Games of 2000 in Sydney
Vents Armands Krauklis (born 1964), musician, politician, former mayor of Valka city (2001–2006), member of Saeima (2006-2010), current mayor of Valka municipality
Roberts Ķīlis (born 1968), social anthropologist, former Minister of Education and Science (2011-2013)
Pavel Loskutov (born 1969), Estonian long-distance runner
Gatis Smukulis (born 1987), road bicycle racer
Andris Vilks (born 1963), former Minister of Finance (2009-2014)
Arturs Neikšāns (born 1983), Latvian chess player, commentator, and coach, multiple-time Latvian champion.

Twin towns — sister cities

Valka is twinned with:

 Braslaw, Belarus
 Çamlıyayla, Turkey
 I'billin, Israel
 Kutaisi, Georgia
 Marijampolė, Lithuania
 Novoye Devyatkino, Russia
 Valga, Estonia
 Valga, Spain

Gallery

See also
Valka Town Theatre
Valga, Estonia

References

External links

 

 
Towns in Latvia
Divided cities
Estonia–Latvia border crossings
1584 establishments in Europe
Kreis Walk
Valka Municipality